Phratora interstitialis is a species of leaf beetle in the family Chrysomelidae. It is found in Europe and Northern Asia (excluding China) and North America. This leaf beetle feeds on host plants that are poor in salicylates (e.g. Salix alexensis and Salix sitchensis) and is closely related to the European Phratora vulgatissima, which also feeds on salicylate-poor willows.

References

Further reading

 
 

Chrysomelinae
Beetles of Asia
Beetles of Europe
Beetles of North America
Beetles described in 1853
Taxa named by Carl Gustaf Mannerheim (naturalist)
Articles created by Qbugbot